The Consolidation Line was a series of diesel-electric railway locomotive designs produced by Fairbanks-Morse and its Canadian licensee, the  Canadian Locomotive Company. Railfans have dubbed these locomotives “C-liners”, however F-M referred to the models collectively as the C-Line.  A combined total of 165 units (123 cab-equipped lead A units and 42 cabless booster B units) were produced by F-M and the CLC between 1950 and 1955.

Genesis of the C-liner

Since 1932, Fairbanks-Morse had specialized in the manufacture of opposed piston diesel engines for United States Naval vessels. Not long after, the company produced a   engine that saw limited use in railcar applications on the B&O, Milwaukee Road, and a few other lines. Additionally, two of the 5 × 6s were placed in an experimental center cab switcher locomotive under development by the Reading Railroad (road #87, built in 1939 by the St. Louis Car Company, or SLCC, and scrapped in 1953). A 5 x 6 powered the plant switcher at F-M's Beloit, Wisconsin manufacturing facility.

In 1939, the SLCC placed F-M   engines in six streamlined railcars, which are known today as the FM OP800. In 1944, F-M began production of its own  yard switcher, the H-10-44. Milwaukee Road #760 (originally delivered as #1802), the first Fairbanks-Morse locomotive constructed in their own plant, is now preserved and on display at the Illinois Railway Museum. F-M had yet to produce a railroad road locomotive, or any locomotive prior to the 1944 switcher which was built several years after its conception; all other locomotive producers, except for General Motors (and a few others who manufactured small industrial locomotives), were forced by the government to continue to build reciprocating steam locomotives during much of the war.  All national locomotive production  was subject to strict wartime restrictions regarding the number and type of railroad-related products they could manufacture (the U.S. Government in the name of the Navy commandeered all F-M O-P production well into 1944). Following World War II, North American railways began phasing out their aging steam locomotives and sought to replace them with state-of-the-art diesel locomotives at an ever-increasing rate due to the unfavourable economics of steam propulsion.  Fairbanks-Morse, along with its competing firms, sought to capitalize on this new market opportunity.

In December 1945 F-M produced its first streamlined, cab/carbody dual service diesel locomotive as direct competition to such models as the ALCO FA and PA and EMD FT and E-unit. Assembly of the  unit, which was mounted on an A1A-A1A wheelset, was subcontracted out to General Electric due to lack of space at F-M's Wisconsin plant. GE built the locomotives at its Erie, Pennsylvania facility, thereby giving rise to the name “Erie-built”. F-M retained the services of renowned industrial designer Raymond Loewy to create a visually impressive carbody for the Erie-built. The line was only moderately successful, as a total of 82 cab and 28 booster units was sold through 1949, when production was ended. The Erie-Built program faced several problems, including a nine-month strike in Beloit near the start of production, the cost of outsourcing much of the Erie-Built's design and production to GE, and several high-cost components including two types of unique truck and secondary electrical and cooling systems.
 
F-M wanted to produce a carbody successor to the Erie-Built which could be manufactured in-house, and this required a new ground-up design and expansion of the locomotive shop at Beloit. Because of the design parameters laid down for the new locomotives, only the O-P engine, the traction motors, and a few accessories could be carried over from F-M's hood locomotives. The resulting Consolidation Line (known in-house as the C-Line) debuted in January 1950.

This was  shorter than the Erie-Built, yet had room for a 12-cylinder OP engine (as opposed to the Erie-built's 10-cylinder engine) and a 4,500-lb-per-hour steam generator. The C-Line was offered with 8-cylinder , 10-cylinder , and 12-cylinder  versions of F-M's 38D8-1/8 opposed-piston diesel prime movers. New two-axle trucks with a distinctive curved equalizing bar were developed, which became standard in other F-M locomotives.

C-line models
The model designation followed the format of C (for Consolidation), F or P (Passenger or Freight), A or B (cab or cabless), two digits for horsepower, and one digit for the number of axles, so that CPA-24-5 was a 5-axle 2,400-hp passenger unit with a cab while CFB-16-4 would be a 4-axle, 1600-hp freight booster. Four-axle units used a B-B wheel arrangement, while a B-A1A wheel arrangement (three-axle rear truck with a center idler axle) was used on passenger units where the weight of the steam generator and feedwater tanks would cause the axle load to exceed 66,000 lb. 

The C-Line was intended to consist of seven models, with A and B (cab and cabless) versions of each: Four-axle freight units with 1600, 2000 or 2400 horsepower, four-axle passenger with the 1600-hp engine, and five-axle passenger units with all three engines. However, several proposed models, including the CFA-24-4, CFB-24-4, CPB-20-5 and CPB-24-5 received no orders, and 1600-hp passenger units (in both 4- and 5-axle configurations) were only built by CLC.

CPx-16-4 models had steam generators of 1,600 to 2,800 lb/hr capacity and feedwater tanks of 1,000 to 1,050 gallons, while five-axle passenger models had steam generators rated at 1,600 to 4,500 lb/hr and feedwater capacity of 1,600 to 1,800 gallons, which could be increased to 1,850 gallons on CPx-24-5 models. Most C-liners were fitted out with main electrical generators manufactured by Westinghouse Electric. C-Liners were also built by CLC in Kingston, Ontario, and the last C-liners built by CLC for Canadian National Railways (CPA-16-5 #6700–6705 and CPB-16-5 #6800–6805) had General Electric equipment and lacked dynamic brakes.

Failure in the marketplace
Orders for the C-liners were initially received from the New York Central, followed by the Long Island Rail Road, the Pennsylvania Railroad, the Milwaukee Road and the New Haven. Orders to the Canadian Locomotive Company were also forthcoming in Canada from the Canadian Pacific and Canadian National railways. However, accounts of mechanical unreliability and poor technical support soon began to emerge. The Westinghouse generators in the  C-Line locomotives were prone to flashing over when wheelslip occurred at high speeds (such as on wet rails), and the OP prime movers initially suffered from relatively poor piston life and proved difficult to maintain. Engine reliability and maintenance problems led New York Central to repower all of its 2,000 and 2,400 hp C-Line locomotives (as well as several of its Erie-Builts) with EMD 567 engines in 1955-56, when the locomotives were between 3 and 6 years old. Moreover, railroads were quickly moving away from cab unit designs, and standardizing on road-switcher designs, as offered by the competition in the form of the EMD GP7 or the Alco RS-3 and even the Baldwin DRS-4-4-1500.

Robert Aldag Jr., who would eventually head up F-M's locomotive division, acknowledged that while the C-Line eliminated the high production costs of the Erie-Built, it failed in the marketplace due to its late entry, which he estimated was five years too late to take advantage of the sales boom due to dieselization in the US.

By 1952, orders had dried up in the United States, with a total production run of only 99 units. The units proved relatively more popular in Canada, particularly with the CPR, and orders continued there until 1955. Several variants were only ever produced by the Canadian Locomotive Company, and Canadian roads accepted a total of 66 units. However, Westinghouse had announced in 1953 that it was leaving the locomotive equipment market, in part because of the generator reliability issues in the F-M units. This development made continuing production of the C-liners impractical without a redesign, and since marketplace acceptance was already marginal, the decision was made to end production.

With the Train Master series, F-M continued production of their own road-switcher designs, but these also ultimately proved unsuccessful in the marketplace and Fairbanks-Morse departed the locomotive market.

Models
Life-Like (and later Walthers) produced plastic A- and B-unit models of the four-axle freight C-Line locomotives in HO scale (Proto 1000 series) and N scale (Proto series). Because the C-Line units had identical car bodies, these models are correct for CFA-16-4, CFB-16-4, CFA-20-4 and CFB-20-4 locomotives. They are no longer in production.

Tru-Line Trains made 4- and 5-axle C-Liners in HO and N scale. The site announced that they were returning to production, but no date was given. On August 24, 2020, Atlas announced that they had acquired some Tru-Line Trains molds including the HO scale C-Line model.

Atlas Model Railroad made plastic models of the five-axle passenger C-Liner between 1967 and approximately 1969.

Rivarossi produced plastic four-axle C-Liner A- and B-units between 1954 and 1982. This model was later sold under the AHM brand.

Lionel announced 0 gauge versions of the CPA units (ex. MTH Tooling) in their 2021 Volume 2 catalog.  Scroll to pages 30-33. Dealer Trainworld announced custom versions for the Long Island Rail Road, clad in other LI liveries than offered in the catalog.

Units produced by Fairbanks-Morse (1950–1953)

Freight units

CFA-16-4 (cabs) and CFB-16-4 (cabless boosters)

CFA-20-4 (cabs) and CFB-20-4 (cabless boosters)

Passenger units

CPA-20-5 (cabs)

CPA-24-5 (cabs)

Units produced by the Canadian Locomotive Company (1950–1954)

Freight units

CFA-16-4 (cabs) and CFB-16-4 (cabless boosters)

Passenger units

CPA-16-4 (cabs) and CPB-16-4 (cabless boosters)

CPA-16-5 (cabs) and CPB-16-5 (cabless boosters)

Preservation 
Though none of the C Liners built by Fairbanks-Morse escaped the cutter's torch, 2 A unit and 2 B units built by The Canadian Locomotive Company for the Canadian Pacific Railway are preserved. A unit 4104 is preserved on outdoor display in Nelson, British Columbia, and A unit 4065 is awaiting restoration at the Canadian museum of Science and technology in Ottawa.   B units 4455 and 4456 are under private ownership in Calgary, Alberta.

References

Notes

Bibliography

Further reading

External links
 Fairbanks-Morse C-Liners Roster
 Preserved Fairbanks Morse Cab Units
 Canadian Pacific Railway CLC Locomotives

B-A1A locomotives
B-B locomotives
Consolidated line
CLC locomotives
Diesel-electric locomotives of the United States
Railway locomotives introduced in 1950
Locomotives with cabless variants
Streamlined diesel locomotives